Hoppang is a warm snack that is sold throughout South Korea. It is a convenience food version of jjinppang (steamed bread) and is typically filled with smooth, sweetened red bean paste.

History 
Hoppang is a product that makes it easy for the family to eat steamed bread, which was formerly sold at snack bars. It was created when food founder Chang-sung Heo visited Japan in 1969. Heo  created Hoppang as a product that was sold on Japanese streets and sold in the winter, the low-peak season in the bakery industry, and then released it in 1971.

Etymology 
Hoppang was a brand name for the ready-to-eat jjinppang developed by Samlip in 1970, which combined the onomatopoeia ho, ho (the sound for blowing on hot steamed bun) and ppang, the Korean word for bread. Also it has meaning of 'The whole family eats together and smiles; Ho ho'. The brand name soon became the generic name for convenience jjinppang.

Varieties 
Typical hoppang is filled with sweetened red bean paste, but it is also commonly sold stuffed with vegetables and meat, pizza toppings, pumpkin, or buldak.

Steamer- or microwave-ready hoppang is often packaged in multiples at supermarkets and grocery stores, while many convenience stores sell hoppang throughout the winter months in cylindrical heating cabinets designed to steam and keep them warm.

Gallery

See also 

 Bungeo-ppang
 Hotteok
 List of buns
 List of Korean desserts
 List of steamed foods
 List of stuffed dishes

References 

Korean breads
Korean snack food
Steamed buns
Street food in South Korea
Stuffed desserts